Lucie Ignace (born 16 December 1992 in Saint-Denis, Réunion) is a French karateka. She won the gold medal in the 55 kg category at the 2012 World Karate Championships in Paris after securing a bronze medal at the 2012 European Karate Championships in Tenerife. In June 2015, she competed in the inaugural European Games, for France in karate, more specifically, Women's Kumite for 61 kilograms. She earned a gold medal.

At the 2013 World Games held in Cali, Colombia, she won the gold medal in the women's kumite 55 kg event.

References

External links
 

1992 births
Living people
French female karateka
European Games medalists in karate
European Games gold medalists for France
Karateka at the 2015 European Games
Mediterranean Games silver medalists for France
Mediterranean Games medalists in karate
Competitors at the 2013 Mediterranean Games
World Games medalists in karate
World Games gold medalists
Competitors at the 2013 World Games
Sportspeople from Saint-Denis, Réunion
Sportswomen from Réunion
20th-century French women
21st-century French women